Hog Jaw is an unincorporated community in Montgomery County, Arkansas, United States. The community is approximately one mile south of the Ouachita River and 29 miles east of Mena in adjacent Polk County.

References

Unincorporated communities in Montgomery County, Arkansas
Unincorporated communities in Arkansas